The Modular Boot System (MBS) is a multifunctional, multi-theater footwear system that will afford the soldier environmental protection and added capability in environmental conditions ranging from . It is a developmental program designed to replace the Army Combat Boot hot and temperate weather variants, ICWB w/RL and black Cold Weather Boot, which has already been phased out.

Sources
This article incorporates work from https://peosoldier.army.mil/newpeo/Equipment/Temp.asp?id=cie_cwsb, which is in the public domain as it is a work of the United States Military.

Military boots
United States Army uniforms